Anudeep K. V. is an Indian film director, who has directed Telugu and Tamil language films. He rose to fame with his comedy entertainer Jathi Ratnalu featuring Naveen Polishetty.

Career
Anudeep first garnered attention through his short film, Missed Call, which led to Telugu film screenwriters approaching him to write few scenes for their films. He subsequently joined as an assistant director under Virinchi Varma for Uyyala Jampala (2013), before moving on to direct a film, Pittagoda (2016). The film had a low-key release and did not perform well at the box-office.

Anudeep was approached by filmmaker Nag Ashwin to make a film inspired from his earlier short film, Missed Call, and commissioned Jathi Ratnalu (2021) to be made. Upon release, the film became one of the most profitable Telugu films of 2021 and gave Anudeep a career breakthrough. A critic from Times of India gave the film three stars out of five and termed it as "A madcap comedy featuring 'silly fools'." She opined that in spite of weak story, the one-liners that roll one after another keep you engrossed. She concluded the review calling "Jathi Rathnalu is a mixed bag" but worth for its comedy and the performances." A reviewer for Firstpost also gave three stars out of five and opined that the script of the film is packed with funny one-liners, and every scene is interesting. The reviewer added "It is an unapologetic madcap entertainer, and does not hold itself back until the final moment."

Following the success of the film, Anudeep moved on to make a Tamil film titled Prince (2022), featuring Sivakarthikeyan in the lead role of an Indian man falling in love with a Pondicherry-based English woman. The film opened to negative reviews from critics and did not perform well at the box office. In 2022, Anudeep also worked on First Day First Show as a writer.

Filmography

References

External links

Living people
Tamil film directors
Film directors from Telangana
Year of birth missing (living people)
21st-century Indian film directors
Telugu screenwriters